Philippe Duquesne (born 30 June 1965) is a French actor. He is best known for playing in the cult TV series Les Deschiens (1993–2002), in which he plays alongside Yolande Moreau.

Theater

Filmography

References

External links 
 

French male film actors
Living people
20th-century French male actors
21st-century French male actors
French male stage actors
French male television actors
1965 births
People from Béthune